Osterburg is a railway station in the town of Osterburg, Saxony-Anhalt, Germany. The station lies on the Magdeburg-Wittenberge railway and the train services are operated by Deutsche Bahn.

Train services
The station is served by the following services:
regional bahn  Wittenberge - Stendal - Magdeburg Hbf - Schönebeck (Elbe) - Schönebeck-Salzelmen

References

Railway stations in Saxony-Anhalt